Big Beaver may refer to:

Big Beaver, Pennsylvania, a borough in Beaver County
Big Beaver, Saskatchewan, a hamlet
 Big Beaver, background character from Foster’s Home for Imaginary Friends

See also
Big Beaver Airport, in Troy, Michigan
Big Beaver Creek, in Lancaster County, Pennsylvania